Pacific Pines is a northern suburb in the City of Gold Coast, Queensland, Australia.

Geography 
Pacific Pines is located between the Pacific Motorway (M1) and the north-north-east side of the Nerang State Forest.

History

On 9 September 1994 Pacific Pines was originally gazetted as a neighbourhood within the suburb of Gaven. The name Pacific Pines was proposed by the land developer. It became a separate suburb on 7 February 2003.

In 1990 Stockland bought  of land in 1990 and designed it as a residential area with the capacity for 5,800 house lots and various community areas/features (e.g. parks, taverns, BBQ's).

Pacific Pines State High School opened on 1 January 2000.

Jubilee Primary School opened in January 2001. It is operated by Brisbane Catholic Education as an ecumenical school through a partnership of local churches: St Mary’s Catholic Community, Coomera; Southland International - Apostolic Australia Church; Gold Coast North Anglican Church; Living Rivers Uniting Church and New Life Uniting Church.

Pacific Pines State School opened on 1 January 2002.

Park Lake State School opened on 1 January 2008 with an initial enrolment of 212 students.

At the  Pacific Pines had an estimated population of 14,788.

Sport and Recreation

Pacific Pines is home of the Pacific Pines Panthers Basketball Club. The Panthers opened their doors in 2013 and represent age groups from under 9 to under 20. They fall under the Gold Coast City Regional Basketball Association.

Nature
A part of Pacific Pines is located next to the Nerang National Park. There are many types of native and non-native animals located throughout the suburb. Some of these animals include kangaroos, various types of snakes, lizards, birds and wallabies. Non-Native animals have been introduced into the close by Nerang National Park and therefore have spread to many parts of the area. Some of these animals include the European rabbit, fallow deer, European fox and the cane toad.

Education 
Pacific Pines State School is a government primary (Prep-6) school for boys and girls at Santa Isobel Boulevard. In 2017, the school had an enrolment of 949 students with 69 teachers (62 full-time equivalent) and 34 non-teaching staff (24 full-time equivalent). It includes a special education program.

Park Lake State School is a government primary (Prep-6) school for boys and girls at 1 Shoalhaven Avenue. In 2017, the school had an enrolment of 992 students with 68 teachers (62 full-time equivalent) and 33 non-teaching staff (23 full-time equivalent).  It includes a special education program.

Jubilee Primary School is a Catholic primary (Prep-6) school for boys and girls at 34 Manra Way. In 2017, the school had an enrolment of 593 students with 41 teachers (35 full-time equivalent) and 21 non-teaching staff (14 full-time equivalent).

Pacific Pines State High School is a government secondary (7-12) school for boys and girls at Archipelago Street. In 2017, the school had an enrolment of 1,377 students with 103 teachers (100 full-time equivalent) and 50 non-teaching staff (36 full-time equivalent). It includes a special education program.

References

External links 

 

Suburbs of the Gold Coast, Queensland